You've Come a Long Way, Katie is a Canadian television miniseries, directed by Vic Sarin and broadcast by CBC Television in 1981. The series stars Lally Cadeau as Kate Forbes, a television talk show host struggling with alcoholism.

The cast also includes Douglas Campbell, Dinah Christie, Ken James, Catherine O'Hara and Booth Savage.

The miniseries aired as three one-hour episodes on January 4, 5 and 6, 1981, and was followed immediately by the premiere of the sitcom Hangin' In, also starring Cadeau, on January 7. Writing for Maclean's, Bill MacVicar likened the four-night streak of the two series to "the video equivalent of being shot from a cannon or, at least, making a premiere entrance on a red carpet, with klieg lights and a ravenous crowd of autograph seekers".

The miniseries was a Bijou Award nominee for Best Television Drama Over 30 Minutes, and Cadeau won the award for Best Actress in a Non-Feature. Cadeau also won the Earle Grey Award for Best Performance in a Television Film at the 11th ACTRA Awards in 1982.

References

External links

1981 films
1980s Canadian television miniseries
1980s Canadian drama television series
CBC Television original programming
English-language Canadian films